"Music Is the Key" is a song by German recording artist Sarah Connor and all-male American a cappella group Naturally 7. The song was written and produced by longtime collaborators Rob Tyger and Kay Denar and recorded for Connor's third studio album, Key to My Soul (2003). The track talks about the power of music, and eventually finding your own melody through listening.

"Music Is the Key" was positively reviewed by music critics, many of whom complimented its lyrical content and vocals. Selected as the lead single from Key to My Soul and released on 3 November 2003, it became an instant success, reaching number one on the German Singles Chart and peaking within the top five in Belgium and Switzerland.

Track listings
European CD single
 "Music Is the Key" (Video Version) – 4:04
 "Music Is the Key" (Album Version) – 4:37

European CD maxi single
 "Music Is the Key" (Video Version) – 4:04
 "Music Is the Key" (Album Version) – 4:37
 "Music Is the Key" (A Cappella Version) – 4:04
 "Music Is the Key" (Video - Director's Cut) – 4:37

Charts

Weekly charts

Year-end charts

Certifications

References

2003 singles
2003 songs
Epic Records singles
Number-one singles in Germany
Sarah Connor (singer) songs
Songs written by Kay Denar
Songs written by Rob Tyger
X-Cell Records singles